Faggot, faggots, or faggoting may refer to:

Arts and crafts 
 Faggoting (metalworking), forge welding a bundle of bars of iron and steel
 Faggoting (knitting), variation of lace knitting in which every stitch is a yarn over or a decrease
 Faggoting stitch, featherstitch, or Cretan stitch, embroidery stitch used to make decorative seams or to attach insertions
 Bassoon, called fagotto, faggot, fagott, fagot in other languages

Biology 
 Faggot cell, cell type found in acute promyelocytic leukemia
 Eumeta crameri or faggot worm, from the bundles of twigs it binds to itself

Branch 
 faggot or fagot, branch or twig, or bundle of these
 Fascine, bundle of brushwood used in civil and military engineering
 Fasces, ancient symbol of an axe bound in a bundle of rods
 Faggot (unit), archaic unit of measurement for bundles of sticks

Food 
 Faggot (food), British meatball commonly made of pork offal

Slang 
 Faggot (slang), a pejorative for a gay man
 Faggots (novel), 1978 novel by Larry Kramer
Faggot, a track from Deadbeat Hero by Doug Stanhope
"Faggot", a song by  Mindless Self Indulgence
"Faggot", a song by Arca from Mutant
 Faget (song), by  American band Korn

Surname 
 Jacob Faggot (1699–1777), Swedish scientist
 Nicholas Faggot, character in the 1824 novel Redgauntlet by Sir Walter Scott

Other
Faggot, Northumberland, uninhabited island off England
Ashen faggot, English West country Christmas tradition
 Faggot voter, exploiting an electoral abuse
The Faggot, 1876 book by Charles Tylor

See also 
 Fag (disambiguation)
 Fagg (disambiguation)
 Fagot (disambiguation)